Victor Lucas may refer to:

 Victor Lucas (television producer), Canadian television producer and personality
 Victor Lucas (footballer) (1907–1979), Australian rules footballer